Apollon Systsov (1929–2005) was a Soviet engineer and statesman who held several posts. He was the last minister of aviation industry.

Early life and education
Systsov was born in Melekess (now Dimitrovgrad) on 25 September 1929. His father worked as a Russian-language teacher. He graduated from the Tashkent Polytechnic Institute obtaining a degree in mechanical engineering with a focus on aircraft construction.

Career
Following his graduation Systsov worked at the Tashkent Aviation Plant. After working in different posts he was made the general director of the Ulyanovsk Aviation Industrial Complex and a member of the collegium of the Ministry of Aviation Industry. He joined the Communist Party and was among its central committee members. He was appointed first deputy minister of the aviation industry in 1981 and remained in the post until 1985. Systsov was named as the minister of the aviation industry in 1985, replacing Ivan Silayev in the post. Systsov's term as minister ended in August 1991 when the ministry was also disestablished.

Death
Systsov died in Moscow on 8 May 2005 and was buried at the Troyekurovskoye cemetery, Moscow.

Awards
Systsov was the recipient of the following: Order of Lenin, Order of the October Revolution and Order of the Red Banner of Labour (twice) and USSR State Prize.

References

External links

20th-century Russian engineers
21st-century Russian engineers
1929 births
2005 deaths
Central Committee of the Communist Party of the Soviet Union members
Lenin Prize winners
People's commissars and ministers of the Soviet Union
Recipients of the Order of the Red Banner of Labour
Soviet mechanical engineers
Burials in Troyekurovskoye Cemetery
Recipients of the USSR State Prize